Chalcosyrphus (Xylotomima) sacawajeae (Shannon, 1926), the Hairy-winged Leafwalker, is a rare species of syrphid fly  observed in the Northern United States and Western Canada. Hoverflies can remain nearly motionless while in flight. The adults are also known as flower flies for they are commonly found on flowers, from which they get both energy-giving nectar and protein-rich pollen.

Distribution
United States.

References

Eristalinae
Insects described in 1926
Diptera of North America
Hoverflies of North America
Taxa named by Raymond Corbett Shannon